Black Rhythm Happening is the second album by American trumpeter Eddie Gale recorded in 1969 and released on the Blue Note label.

Reception
The Allmusic review by Thom Jurek awarded the album 4½ stars and stated "Eddie Gale's second Blue Note outing as a leader is one of the most adventurous recordings to come out of the 1960s. Black Rhythm Happening picks up where Ghetto Music left off, in that it takes the soul and free jazz elements of his debut and adds to them the sound of the church in all its guises... Black Rhythm Happening is a timeless, breathtaking recording, one that sounds as forward-thinking and militant in the 21st century as it did in 1969".

Track listing
All compositions by Eddie Gale except as noted
 "Black Rhythm Happening" - 2:57
 "The Gleeker" (Gale, Joann Gale Stevens) - 2:16
 "Song of Will" - 3:08
 "Ghetto Love Night" - 5:30
 "Mexico Thing" - 5:08
 "Ghetto Summertime" - 3:13
 "It Must Be You" - 5:44
 "Look at Teyonda" - 9:31
Recorded at Rudy Van Gelder Studio, Englewood Cliffs, New Jersey on May 2, 1969.

Personnel
Eddie Gale - trumpet
Roland Alexander - soprano saxophone, flute (tracks 1-5, 7 & 8)
Jimmy Lyons - alto saxophone (tracks 1-5, 7 & 8)
Russell Lyle - tenor saxophone, flute (tracks 1-5, 7 & 8)
Jo Ann Gale Stevens - guitar, vocals  (tracks 1-5, 7 & 8)
Henry Pearson, Judah Samuel - bass
Elvin Jones  - drums
John Robinson - African drums (tracks 1-5, 7 & 8)
Sylvia Bibbs, Charles Davis, Paula Nadine Larkin, William Norwood, Fulumi Prince, Carol Ann Robinson, Sondra Walston - vocals (tracks 1-5, 7 & 8)

References

Blue Note Records albums
Eddie Gale albums
1969 albums
Albums recorded at Van Gelder Studio